Linden Row is a set of seven historic rowhouses located in Richmond, Virginia.  They were built in 1847 and 1853, and are three-story, Greek Revival style brick veneer townhouses on high basements and topped by a simple white cornice of wood. Each house has an identical Grecian Doric order entrance porch supported by two fluted Doric columns. A three-story porch runs the entire length of the back of the houses.  Linden Row includes a house owned by noted author Mary Johnston, who died there in 1936.

It was listed on the National Register of Historic Places in 1971.

References

External links 
Linden Row, 100-118 East Franklin Street, Richmond, Independent City, VA: 6 photos at Historic American Buildings Survey

Historic American Buildings Survey in Virginia
Houses on the National Register of Historic Places in Virginia
Greek Revival houses in Virginia
Houses completed in 1853
Houses in Richmond, Virginia
National Register of Historic Places in Richmond, Virginia
Houses completed in 1847
1847 establishments in Virginia